A production team was formerly the basic accounting and farm production unit in the people's commune system in People's Republic of China from 1958 to 1984.

Production teams were largely disbanded during the agricultural reforms of 1982–1985. In the administrative hierarchy, the team was the lowest level, the next higher levels being the production brigade and people's commune. Typically the team owned most of the land and was responsible for income distribution.

See also

Economic history of the People's Republic of China